Skookumchuck is a Chinook Jargon term that is in common use in British Columbia English and occurs in Pacific Northwest English.  Skookum means "strong" or "powerful", and "chuck" means water, so skookumchuck means "rapids" or "whitewater" (literally, "strong water"), or fresh, healthy water. It can mean any rapids, but in coastal usage refers to the powerful tidal rapids at the mouths of most of the major coastal inlets.

Places named Skookumchuck include:
Skookumchuck, British Columbia, a town in British Columbia named for the large rapids in this area on the Kootenay River.
Skookumchuck Hot Springs, British Columbia, a town in British Columbia
Skookumchuck Narrows, a narrow entrance passage into Sechelt Inlet, a fjord in British Columbia's Sunshine Coast
Skookumchuck Narrows Provincial Park, a park located at the narrows
Skookumchuck Rapids Provincial Park, a park near Mabel Lake, British Columbia
Skookumchuck River, a river in southwestern Washington
Skookumchuck, Thurston County, Washington, a populated place
Skookumchuck Creek, Kittitas County, Washington
Skookumchuck Creek, Idaho County, Idaho
Skookumchuk Trail, Franconia, New Hampshire

Tidal rapids termed skookumchucks include:
Quatsino Narrows

See also
 List of Chinook Jargon placenames
 Chinook Jargon use by English-language speakers

References

External links
 Kayaking the Skookumchuck
 Wooden sea kayak surfing Skookumchuck Rapids

Chinook Jargon place names
Former disambiguation pages converted to set index articles
Geography of British Columbia
Water in Alaska
Water in Washington (state)